Daniel Osher Nathan is an American philosopher and Professor of Philosophy at Texas Tech University. 
He is known for his expertise on aesthetics, ethical theory, and philosophy of law.

Views
Nathan defends an anti-intentionalist position in aesthetic interpretation and believes that intentionalism stems from a faulty analogy between an artwork and an utterance for communication.

See also
William K. Wimsatt
Monroe Beardsley
Judicial interpretation
Legal interpretation

References

External links
 Daniel O. Nathan's Website
 Nathan's papers
 Daniel O. Nathan at Texas Tech University

21st-century American educators
21st-century American essayists
21st-century American male writers
21st-century American philosophers
American ethicists
American legal scholars
American literary critics
American literary theorists
American male essayists
American male non-fiction writers
American philosophy academics
Analytic philosophers
Communication theorists
Critical theorists
Date of birth missing (living people)
Literacy and society theorists
Living people
Mass media theorists
Media critics
Philosophers of art
Philosophers of culture
Philosophers of law
Philosophers of literature
Philosophers of social science
Philosophy writers
Place of birth missing (living people)
Texas Tech University faculty
University of Illinois Chicago alumni
University of Michigan alumni
Year of birth missing (living people)